The Ministry of Expatriates of Syria was the ministry that was responsible for communication with Syrian expatriates around the world. It was established in 2002. It merged into the Ministry of Foreign Affairs and Emigrants on 14 April 2011.

Ministers of Expatriates
 Bouthaina Shaaban (2002 – 30 July 2008)
 Dr. Joseph Sweid (30 July 2008 – 14 April 2011)

References

External links
 Ministry of Expatriates Official Website (Arabic) (English) (Spanish)

Expatriates
Syria, Expatriates
Syria, Expatriates
Diaspora ministries
2002 establishments in Syria
2011 disestablishments in Syria
Syrian diaspora